
Year 853 (DCCCLIII) was a common year starting on Sunday (link will display the full calendar) of the Julian calendar.

Events 
 By place 
 Byzantine Empire 
 May 22 – A Byzantine fleet (85 ships and 5,000 men) sacks and destroys the port city of Damietta, located on the Nile Delta in Egypt. A large quantity of weapons and supplies intended for the Emirate of Crete are captured.

 Europe 
 Danish Vikings attempt to subjugate the Curonians on the shoreline of the Baltic Sea, but they are repulsed. King Olof leads Swedish Vikings in retaliation, and attacks the towns of Seeburg and Apuolė (modern Courland).
 Viking marauders in Gaul sail eastward from Nantes without opposition, and reach Tours. The monasteries at Saint-Florent-le-Vieil and Marmoutier are ravaged.
 King Charles the Bald bribes Boris I, ruler (khan) of the Bulgarian Empire, to form an alliance against his brother Louis the German, with Rastislav of Moravia.
 Gauzbert, count of Maine, is killed during an ambush by citizens of Nantes, in revenge for the death of Lambert II.

 Britain 
 King Burgred of Mercia appeals to Æthelwulf, king of the West Saxons, for help against the rebellious Welsh king Rhodri the Great. Æthelwulf agrees to send help, and Wales is subdued as far north as Anglesey.
 Burgred (who inherited his crown last year) marries Æthelwulf's daughter Æthelswith, during a ceremony at the royal estate at Chippenham.

 China 
 Tuan Ch'eng-Shih, Chinese author and scholar during the Tang Dynasty, publishes Miscellaneous Offerings from Yu-yang.

 By topic 
 Religion 
 The Fraumünster Church in Zürich (modern Switzerland) is founded by Louis the German.

Births 
 Abu Jafar al-Tahawi, Muslim scholar (d. 933)
 Abu Mansur al-Maturidi, Muslim theologian (d. 944)
 Adelaide, queen of the West Frankish Kingdom (or 850) 
 Ma Yin, Chinese warlord and king (approximate date)

Deaths 
 March 27 – Haymo, bishop of Halberstadt
 Áilgenán mac Donngaile, king of Munster (Ireland)
 Columba, Spanish nun and martyr
 Ealhere, Kentish thegn
 Gauzbert, count of Maine (approximate date)
 Ishaq ibn Isma'il, emir of Tbilisi (Georgia)
 Ishaq ibn Rahwayh, Muslim imam (or 852)
 Konstanti Kakhi, Georgian nobleman (b. 768)
 Ono no Takamura, Japanese scholar (b. 802)
 Theodrada, Frankish abbess, daughter of Charlemagne (or 844)
 Virasena, Indian mathematician (b. 792)

References

Sources